() is a Greek word meaning 'incision.'

Classical Greek
1. The original meaning, following etymology, in classical texts means 'incision,' 'notch,' or 'groove,' (Theophrastus The Hippocratic treatises 4.8.10, and Symmachus Sm.Je.31 (48).37), whereas  means 'uncarved,' 'smooth,' (Inscriptiones Graecae IG12.372.134, cf. 373.231). The plural, 'notches,' is found in Artemidorus (1.67) and 'written in the incision of the rock', Philochorus Historicus, 4th century BCE (138).

2. Photius Lexicographus, 9th century AD).

3.

New Testament
It is the Greek word translated 'beware of the concision,' in Philippians 3:2, KJV. The term 'mutilation' is contrasted with "we are the circumcision, which worship God in the spirit, and rejoice in Christ Jesus, and have no confidence in the flesh." The context is the circumcision controversy in early Christianity.

References

Greek words and phrases